Teknecik can refer to:

 Teknecik
 Teknecik, Horasan
 Teknecik, Refahiye